Divine Intervention is a 2007 American romantic comedy-drama film directed by Van Elder, starring Wesley Jonathan, Jazsmin Lewis and James Avery.

Cast
 Wesley Jonathan as Reverend Robert Gibbs
 Jazsmin Lewis as Divine Matthews
 James Avery as Reverend Clarence Matthews
 Laz Alonso as Deacon Wells
 Roz Ryan as Mother Candice
 Carl Gilliard as Deacon Grier
 Cynda Williams as Sister Grier
 Luenell as Sister Jones
 Reynaldo Rey as Deacon Jones
 Shang Forbes as Deacon Thomas
 Van Elder as usher

Release
The film received a limited theatrical release on 30 November 2007.

Reception
Frank Lovece of Film Journal International wrote a negative review of the film, while praising the performances of Avery, Ryan and Luenelle.

Sam Adams of the Los Angeles Times wrote that Elders "lingers on subsidiary diversions when he should be advancing the plot", and "even his establishing shots overstay their welcome".

Tim Grierson of LA Weekly wrote a negative review of the film.

References

External links
 
 

American romantic comedy-drama films
2007 romantic comedy-drama films